Mathias Rundgreen (born 21 February 1991) is a Norwegian cross-country skier.

He competed in three events at the 2011 Junior World Championships, winning a gold medal in the relay. He later competed at the 2012, 2013 and 2014 Junior World Championships, all in the U23 age class, and took a bronze medal in the 2014 15 km.

He made his World Cup debut in March 2014 in the Holmenkollen 50 km race, collecting his first World Cup points in January 2015 with a 27th place in the Rybinsk 15 km. He broke the top 10 and 20 at the same time with a seventh place in the March 2015 Lahti sprint. He made the podium for the first time in February 2017 in PyeongChang, finishing third in the 15+15 km skiathlon.

He represents the sports club Byåsen IL.

Cross-country skiing results
All results are sourced from the International Ski Federation (FIS).

World Cup

Season standings

Individual podiums

 1 podium – (1 )

Team podiums
 1 victory – (1 ) 
 2 podiums – (2 )

References 

1991 births
Living people
Sportspeople from Trondheim
Norwegian male cross-country skiers